In statistics and probability theory, a point process or point field is a collection of mathematical points randomly located on a mathematical space such as the real line or Euclidean space.
Point processes can be used for spatial data analysis, which is of interest in such diverse disciplines as forestry, plant ecology, epidemiology, geography, seismology, materials science, astronomy, telecommunications, computational neuroscience, economics and others.

There are different mathematical interpretations of a point process, such as a random counting measure or a random set. Some authors regard a point process and stochastic process as two different objects such that a point process is a random object that arises from or is associated with a stochastic process, though it has been remarked that the difference between point processes and stochastic processes is not clear. Others consider a point process as a stochastic process, where the process is indexed by sets of the underlying space on which it is defined, such as the real line or  -dimensional Euclidean space.  Other stochastic processes such as renewal and counting processes are studied in the theory of point processes. Sometimes the term "point process" is not preferred, as historically the word "process" denoted an evolution of some system in  time, so point process is also called a random point field.

Point processes on the real line form an important special case that is particularly amenable to study, because the points are ordered in a natural way, and the whole point process can be described completely by the (random) intervals between the points. These point processes are frequently used as models for random events in time, such as the arrival of customers in a queue (queueing theory), of impulses in a neuron (computational neuroscience), particles in a Geiger counter, location of radio stations in a telecommunication network or of searches on the world-wide web.

General point process theory
In mathematics, a point process is a random element whose values are "point patterns" on a set S. While in the exact mathematical definition a point pattern is specified as a locally finite counting measure, it is sufficient for more applied purposes to think of a point pattern as a countable subset of S that has no limit points.

Definition

To define general point processes, we start with a probability space ,
and a measurable space  where  is a locally compact
Borel σ-algebra. Consider now an integer-valued locally finite kernel 
from  into , that is, a mapping
 such that:
This kernel defines a random measure in the following way. We would like to think of 
as defining a mapping which maps  to a measure 
(namely),
This -field is constructed as the minimal algebra so that all evaluation maps of the form
, where  is relatively compact,
are measurable. Equipped with this -field, then  is a random element, where for every

Now, by a point process on  we simply mean an integer-valued random measure (or equivalently, integer-valued
kernel)  constructed as above.
The most common example for the state space S is the Euclidean space Rn or a subset thereof, where a particularly interesting special case is given by the real half-line [0,∞). However, point processes are not limited to these examples and may among other things also be used if the points are themselves compact subsets of Rn, in which case ξ is usually referred to as a particle process.

It has been noted that the term point process is not a very good one if S is not a subset of the real line, as it might suggest that ξ is a stochastic process. However, the term is well established and uncontested even in the general case.

Representation

Every instance (or event) of a point process ξ can be represented as

Another different but useful representation of an event (an event in the event space, i.e. a series of points) is the counting notation, where each instance is represented as an  function, a continuous function which takes integer values: :

which is the number of events in the observation interval .

Expectation measure

The expectation measure Eξ (also known as  mean measure) of a point process ξ is a measure on S that assigns to every Borel subset B of S the expected number of points of ξ in B. That is,

Laplace functional

The Laplace functional  of a point process N is a
map from the set of all positive valued functions f on the state space of N, to  defined as follows:

They play a similar role as the characteristic functions for random variable. One important theorem says that: two point processes have the same law if their Laplace functionals are equal.

Moment measure

The th power of a point process,  is defined on the product space  as follows :

By monotone class theorem, this uniquely defines the product measure on   The expectation  is called
the  th moment measure. The first moment measure is the mean measure.

Let  . The joint intensities of a point process  w.r.t. the Lebesgue measure are functions  such that for any disjoint bounded Borel subsets 

 

Joint intensities do not always exist for point processes. Given that moments of a random variable determine the random variable in many cases, a similar result is to be expected for joint intensities. Indeed, this has been shown in many cases.

Stationarity

This  is called the intensity of the point process. A stationary point process on  has almost surely either 0 or an infinite number of points in total. For more on stationary point processes and random measure, refer to Chapter 12 of Daley & Vere-Jones.

Examples of point processes

We shall see some examples of point processes in

Poisson point process

The simplest and most ubiquitous example of a point process is the Poisson point process, which is a spatial generalisation of the Poisson process. A Poisson (counting) process on the line can be characterised by two properties : the number of points (or events) in disjoint intervals are independent and have a Poisson distribution. A Poisson point process can also be defined using these two properties. Namely, we say that a point process  is a Poisson point process if the following two conditions hold

1)  are independent for disjoint subsets

2) For any bounded subset ,  has a Poisson distribution with parameter  where
 denotes the Lebesgue measure.

The two conditions can be combined and written as follows : For any disjoint bounded subsets  and non-negative integers  we have that

The constant  is called the intensity of the Poisson point process. Note that the Poisson point process is characterised by the single parameter  It is a simple, stationary point process.
To be more specific one calls the above point process a homogeneous Poisson point process. An inhomogeneous Poisson process is defined as above but by replacing  with  where  is a non-negative function on

Cox point process

More formally, let  be a random measure. A Cox point process driven by the random measure  is the point process  with the following two properties :

Given ,  is Poisson distributed with parameter  for any bounded subset 
For any finite collection of disjoint subsets  and conditioned on  we have that  are independent.

It is easy to see that Poisson point process (homogeneous and inhomogeneous) follow as special cases of Cox point processes.

For a Cox point process,  is called the intensity measure. Further, if  has a (random) density (Radon–Nikodym derivative)  i.e.,

then  is called the intensity field of the Cox point process. Stationarity of the intensity measures or intensity fields imply the stationarity of the corresponding Cox point processes.

There have been many specific classes of Cox point processes that have been studied in detail such as:
Log-Gaussian Cox point processes:   for a Gaussian random field 
Shot noise Cox point processes:,   for a Poisson point process  and kernel 
Generalised shot noise Cox point processes:  for a point process  and kernel 
Lévy based Cox point processes:  for a Lévy basis  and kernel , and
Permanental Cox point processes:  for k independent Gaussian random fields 's
Sigmoidal Gaussian Cox point processes:   for a Gaussian random field  and random 

By Jensen's inequality, one can verify that Cox point processes satisfy the following inequality: for all bounded Borel subsets ,

where  stands for a Poisson point process with intensity measure  Thus points are distributed with greater variability in a Cox point process compared to a Poisson point process. This is sometimes called clustering or attractive property of the Cox point process.

Determinantal point processes 

An important class of point processes, with applications to physics, random matrix theory, and combinatorics, is that of determinantal point processes.

Hawkes (self-exciting) processes 

A Hawkes process , also known as a self-exciting counting process, is a simple point process whose conditional intensity can be expressed as

 

Geometric processes 

The geometric process has several extensions, including the α- series process and the doubly geometric process.

Point processes on the real half-line

Historically the first point processes that were studied had the real half line R+ = [0,∞) as their state space, which in this context is usually interpreted as time. These studies were motivated by the wish to model telecommunication systems, in which the points represented events in time, such as calls to a telephone exchange.

Point processes on R+ are typically described by giving the sequence of their (random) inter-event times (T1, T2, ...), from which the actual sequence (X1, X2, ...) of event times can be obtained as

If the inter-event times are independent and identically distributed, the point process obtained is called a renewal process.

Intensity of a point process 
The intensity λ(t | Ht)  of a point process on the real half-line with respect to a filtration  Ht  is defined as

Ht can denote the history of event-point times preceding time t but can also correspond to other filtrations (for example in the case of a Cox process).

In the -notation, this can be written in a more compact form:

 

The compensator of a point process, also known as the dual-predictable projection, is the integrated conditional intensity function defined by

Related functions

Papangelou intensity function

The Papangelou intensity function of a point process  in the -dimensional Euclidean space 
is defined as

 

outside .

Likelihood function 
The logarithmic likelihood of a parameterized simple point process conditional upon some observed data is written as

Point processes in spatial statistics

The analysis of point pattern data in a compact subset S of Rn is a major object of study within spatial statistics. Such data appear in a broad range of disciplines, amongst which are

forestry and plant ecology (positions of trees or plants in general)
epidemiology (home locations of infected patients)
zoology (burrows or nests of animals)
geography (positions of human settlements, towns or cities)
seismology (epicenters of earthquakes)
materials science (positions of defects in industrial materials)
astronomy (locations of stars or galaxies)
computational neuroscience (spikes of neurons).

The need to use point processes to model these kinds of data lies in their inherent spatial structure. Accordingly, a first question of interest is often whether the given data exhibit complete spatial randomness (i.e. are a realization of a spatial Poisson process) as opposed to exhibiting either spatial aggregation or spatial inhibition.

In contrast, many datasets considered in classical multivariate statistics consist of independently generated datapoints that may be governed by one or several covariates (typically non-spatial).

Apart from the applications in spatial statistics, point processes are one of the fundamental objects in stochastic geometry. Research has also focussed extensively on various models built on point processes such as Voronoi tessellations, random geometric graphs, and Boolean models.

See also 
Empirical measure
Random measure
Point process notation
Point process operation
Poisson process
Renewal theory
Invariant measure
Transfer operator
Koopman operator
Shift operator

Notes

References

Statistical data types
 
Spatial processes